Los Protegidos is a Spanish fantasy television series created by Darío Madrona and Ruth García that originally aired on Antena 3 from 2010 to 2012. The plot follows the story of the "family" Castillo Rey, a group of people that are actually unrelated to each other but must pose as that because they have one secret: the children have special powers, and there is a group of people that is going after them. It was produced by Boomerang TV.

A continuation of the series, Los protegidos: El regreso, is set to premiere on 19 September 2021.

Plot
Everything starts on a calm neighbourhood in an unnamed city. Jimena (Angie Cepeda), a married woman, is with her daughter Blanca, preparing her for bed. The girl tells her mother that she had a nightmare: two men took her in the middle of the night, and the latter could only run after the van they had taken her in. Jimena calms her worries, tells her to sleep and goes to her own bed, with her husband... and that same night, a van comes, and two men take Blanca in the middle of the night, while Jimena can't do anything but run after the van.

Nine months later, Mario (Antonio Garrido), a widower, works in a police station and takes care of his only son, Carlos (Daniel Avilés), a socially awkward boy who wears glasses and likes books. However, this is not the only problem he has: when Mario starts to talk with him, after having gotten into a fight with some kids at his school, Carlos unexpectedly reveals that he has Telekinesis, which he demonstrates by throwing a pair of scissors into the wall.

In the last nine months, Jimena has divorced, and now spends her free time looking for her missing daughter. However, it's only recently that she has started to tell the people about the dream her daughter had. When Mario hears this, he decides that maybe he could talk with Jimena in order to ascertain what to do, but Jimena, although initially spooked by his awkward manners, finally tells him that she can't do anything.
The next day, Jimena also meets Silvestre Patxi López, a man who apparently knows what happened to Blanca. Silvestre brings her to meet his adopted daughter, Lucía (Priscilla Delgado), a girl that can apparently read minds, as well as a teenager he knows that lives on the street, nicknamed "Culebra" (Lucho Fernandez), meaning "Snake", who can become invisible and uses his power to steal money and support himself. Apparently, there is a group of people that are kidnapping children and teenagers that have special powers, and want to use them for unknown but clearly nefarious purposes. "Culebra" is the only one Silvestre knows that has managed to escape. Silvestre still remembers a boy he had taken in until a pair of "policemen" arrived and took him away, and is now working to find the children and free them, while at the same time preventing the knowledge of the special children from spreading into the main populace.

Meanwhile, Sandra (Ana Fernández), a teenager, gets into a fight with her younger sister and accidentally electrocutes her, knocking her out. Scared, she runs away to avoid having to face her family, and that night, while attempting to sleep in a metro station, she meets "Culebra", who, after discovering her power, takes her to see Silvestre. At the same moment, Jimena decides to call Mario, and both of them with Carlos go visit Silvestre at the same moment.

However, a pair of men from the group that looks for the special children has arrived to Silvestre's house, looking for Lucía. It is only through Lucía's power that Silvestre manages to get his daughter to leave the house. Mario, Jimena, "Culebra", Sandra and Carlos find Lucía in the park, and then they find Silvestre dead. The six are then forced to run away from the men that killed Silvestre, and find they can't go to Mario's house because the bad guys know where it is. Using a series of clues Silvestre had in a journal and that Jimena took, the six go to Valle Perdido, a suburb. There, they rent a house, posing as the "Castillo Rey" family, while they attempt to why was Valle Perdido so important, as well as hiding from those that wish to kidnap the children.

Characters and actors

Main

Despite only appearing in one episode ("La Huida"), Angie Cepeda is credited as a series regular.
Despite having multiple appearances, Óscar Ladoire is only credited as a series regular in episode 13.

References

External links 
 
 

2010 Spanish television series debuts
2012 Spanish television series endings
Antena 3 (Spanish TV channel) network series
Spanish fantasy television series
2010s Spanish drama television series
Television series by Boomerang TV